The Lasker Trap is a chess opening trap in the Albin Countergambit. It is named after Emanuel Lasker, although it was first noted by Serafino Dubois. It is unusual in that it features an underpromotion as early as the seventh move.

Analysis
1. d4 d5 2. c4 e5
The Albin Countergambit.

3. dxe5 d4
The black pawn on d4 is stronger than it appears.

4. e3
Careless. Usual and better is 4.Nf3.

4... Bb4+ 5. Bd2 dxe3 (see diagram)
Now White's best option is to accept doubled pawns with 6.fxe3, which the Encyclopaedia of Chess Openings gives as the best move. Black gets a slight advantage, but White has avoided the worst and can defend.

6. Bxb4
Blundering into the Lasker Trap.

6... exf2+
Now 7.Kxf2 would lose the queen to 7...Qxd1, so White must play 7.Ke2.

7. Ke2 fxg1=N+! (diagram)
Promotion to a knight is the key to the trap. (If instead 7...fxg1=Q, then 8.Qxd8+ Kxd8 9.Rxg1 is okay for White.) Now 8.Rxg1 Bg4+ skewers White's queen, so the king must move again.

8. Ke1 Qh4+ 9. Kd2
The alternative, 9.g3, loses the h1-rook to the fork 9...Qe4+.

9... Nc6
White is hopelessly lost.

Alternate line
In an 1899  in Moscow that involved Blumenfeld, Boyarkow, and Falk playing as White against Lasker, the players played the Lasker Trap line up through Black's fifth move. White responded to 5...dxe3 with 6.Qa4+?, but Black wins after this move also. The game continued 6...Nc6 7.Bxb4 Qh4 8.Ne2 Qxf2+ 9.Kd1 Bg4 10.Nc3 0-0-0+ 11.Bd6 cxd6 12.e6 fxe6 13.Kc1 Nf6 14.b4 d5 15.b5 Ne5 16.cxd5 Nxd5 17.Qc2 Nb4 18.Nd1+ Nxc2 19.Nxf2 Rd2  (White resigned).

See also
List of chess traps

Notes

References

Bibliography

Chess traps
1899 in chess